Sidestrand is a village and a civil parish on the coast of the English county of Norfolk. The nearest railway station is at North Walsham for the Bittern Line which runs between Cromer and Norwich. The nearest airport is Norwich International Airport. From the Census 2011 the population was included in the civil parish of Trimingham.

History
The name Sidestrand is thought to derive from the old English word "sid", meaning broad or spacious, and the Danish "strond", meaning shore. The area was  immortalised as "Poppyland" in the writings of the Victorian journalist Clement Scott.

Coastline
The section of cliffs at Sidestrand is one of the wildest parts of the Norfolk coast due to its rapid erosion. Its beaches and dramatic cliffs are less accessible than most others along this part of the coastline. The 50m high cliffs contain glacial sediments and structures and its beach is popular with petrologists and fossil hunters.

Saint Michael's church
Sidestrand parish church, which is dedicated to Saint Michael, is one of 124 round tower churches in Norfolk. It was erected in 1881 to replace an earlier church, closer to the cliff, that was threatened by coastal erosion. The earlier church was demolished, apart from the tower, which was left as a landmark and finally fell into the sea in 1916. The tower and graveyard had become known as the "Garden of Sleep", after Clement Scott's poem.

Notable burials in Sidestrand churchyard include:
Verily Anderson (1951–2010), author
Samuel Hoare, 1st Viscount Templewood (1880–1959), politician
Paul Paget (1901–1985), architect

Other items of interest
Sidestrand Hall was owned by the Flaxman and Spurrell families before being sold in 1880 to Samuel Hoare (later MP for Norwich). Now known as Sidestrand Hall School, it caters for boys and girls aged 8 to 16 years with moderate learning difficulties.

The windmill in the village was blown over in a gale in 1921.

 was a railway station on the Norfolk and Suffolk Joint Railway which briefly served the Norfolk village from 1936 to 1953. The line ran between Cromer and Mundesley.

The Sidestrand biplane bomber was named after the village; being made at the  Boulton & Paul aircraft factory in Norwich in the late 1920s.

Gallery

References

External links
St Michael's on the European Round Tower Churches website
Sidestrand Literary Links
Sidestrand Hall School
link to pictures of windmill
Landslides and coastal erosion at Sidestrand British Geological Survey

North Norfolk
Populated coastal places in Norfolk
Civil parishes in Norfolk